Kempton may refer to:

Places

Australia
Kempton, Tasmania, a township in Tasmania, Australia

England

Kempton, Shropshire, a village in the west of England
Kempton, a former manor and hamlet, now part of Sunbury-on-Thames, Surrey in the southeast of England
Kempton, an English local nature reserve in Hounslow, London

United States
Kempton, Illinois, a village in Ford County
Kempton, Indiana, a town in Tipton County
Kempton, Maryland, a ghost town in Mayland
Kempton, North Dakota, an unincorporated community in Grand Forks County
Kempton, Pennsylvania, a town in Berks County

Other uses
Kempton (name)